The Landry River (in French: rivière Landry) is a tributary on the south shore of the Nicolet Southwest River. It crosses the municipalities of Cleveland (MRC Le Val-Saint-François Regional County Municipality) and Danville (MRC Les Sources Regional County Municipality), in the administrative region of Estrie, in Quebec, in Canada.

Geography 

The main neighboring hydrographic slopes of the Landry River are:
 north side: Nicolet Southest River;
 east side: Nicolet Southwest River, Danville River;
 south side: Saint-François River, Steele stream;
 west side: Saint-François River.

The Landry River originates from various streams in the "Greenshields" sector of the "Smith Mountains" in the Municipality of Cleveland. The valley path runs along (on the west side) the Landry river.

From the confluence of mountain streams, the Landry River flows over:
  northeasterly, in the township municipality of Cleveland, to the intermunicipal limit of Danville (either the area of the former municipality of Shipton);
  north, crossing route 116, to the confluence of Danville River;

Toponymy 

The term "Landry" constitutes a family name of French origin.

The toponym "Rivière Landry" was made official on December 5, 1968, at the Commission de toponymie du Québec.

See also 
 Lake Saint-Pierre
 List of rivers of Quebec

References 
 

Rivers of Estrie
Le Val-Saint-François Regional County Municipality